Edmund Barff (5 March 1833 – 29 June 1882) was a 19th-century Member of Parliament from the West Coast, New Zealand.

Barff was born in the English county of Kent on 5 March 1833, probably at Lee (now part of Greater London), where he was baptised five months later. He first came to New Zealand to join the West Coast Gold Rush in the mid-1860s. The West Coast was initially part of the Canterbury Province and following a requisition in October 1865, he was first elected as the member of the West Coast Goldfields electorate in the following month. Barff and Evan Prosser, who was elected at the same time, were the first members from the West Coast on the Canterbury Provincial Council. In July 1866, Barff became a member for the Westland electorate. He remained a member of the Canterbury Provincial Council until December 1867. The Westland district separated from the Canterbury Province on 1 January 1868, and Barff joined the Westland County, which was the predecessor to Westland Province. During the existence of Westland County (January 1868 – November 1873), Barff represented the ridings of Westland, Ōkārito, and Arahura. He did not join the Westland Provincial Council, but stood for the first election in January 1874 as one of three candidates in the two-member Arahura electorate (incorrectly referred to as 'Waimea' in some sources). Much to his surprise, he was defeated with 120 votes by Richard Seddon and Houlahan, who were equal at 145 votes.

He represented the Westland South electorate in the House of Representatives from 1868 to 1870, when he was defeated for Hokitika by John White. He then represented the Hokitika electorate from 1876 to 1879, when he was again defeated.

Barff died in Kumara in 1882; he had never married.

Notes

References

|-

1833 births
1882 deaths
New Zealand MPs for South Island electorates
Members of the New Zealand House of Representatives
Members of the Canterbury Provincial Council
Members of the Westland County Council
Unsuccessful candidates in the 1871 New Zealand general election
Unsuccessful candidates in the 1879 New Zealand general election
People from Lee, London
English emigrants to New Zealand
19th-century New Zealand politicians